Rockwall High School is a high school that is part of the Rockwall Independent School District located in Rockwall, Texas.

The average class size is around 600 and the school achieves an average graduation rate of 98%.

Athletics 
The high school offers baseball, basketball, golf, cross country, gymnastics, soccer, track and field, football, powerlifting, softball, swimming, tennis, volleyball, and wrestling. In the 2015 season, the Yellowjacket football team went undefeated in district play and ended up 10–4 in the overall season. The wrestling team won state championships in 2001 and 2002. Daniel Shofner won the individual wrestling heavyweight state championship in 2005. The girls varsity basketball team won the state championship in 2007 after a perfect 40–0 season. In 2011, they achieved second place in the state. In 2005 the baseball team lost to Humble Kingwood 10–5 in the State Championship Game. Rockwall's High School Football Team won the 1963 2A Football State Championship by a score 7–6 against Dulles at Baylor Stadium in Waco, Texas. In 2017 the RHS Girls Gymnastics Team won State by a margin of Five-eighths of a point over San Angelo Central High School April 28–29 in Odessa, TX. The Lady Jackets finished with 230.4 team points to Central's 229.875.
In 2021, for the first time in history, coach Cameron Sweny led the Rockwall High School Men’s gymnastics team to a state title over Saginaw High with a 178.35 point compulsory score, and a 162.75 optional score. The team then went on to complete the title defense in 2022 with a combined team score of 337.55 over the second place Highland Park Scott’s. This team featured many stars including an all time team on the pommel horse headlined by Matthew Hafele (Class of 22), James Watkins (Class of 22), Caden Nowaczyk (Class of 23), Trey Lopez (Class of 24), and Joshua Smelser (Class of 24).

The Academic Decathlon team is known as one of the top teams in both Texas and the nation. In 2013 and 2014, Rockwall won first place in the state of Texas and first place in the nation among public schools (3rd overall).

The school shares the Wilkerson Sanders Memorial Stadium with Rockwall-Heath High School.

Notable people

Alumni
 Dan Bartlett, counsel to President George W. Bush
 Amber Carrington, finalist on The Voice Season 4
 Andy Tanner, Former professional football player
 Zack Eskridge, Former professional football player
 Ralph Hall, US Representative from Texas 4th district
 Winsor Harmon, Class of 1982, actor and model
 Roger Kieschnick, Class of 2006, professional baseball player
 Jaxon Smith-Njigba, Football player

Faculty
Todd Dodge, former football coach

References

External links
 
 Rockwall Independent School District Home Page
 Rockwall High School Band

Schools in Rockwall County, Texas
Public high schools in Texas
International Baccalaureate schools in Texas